The Kaolack region is a region in Senegal.  It borders Gambia and is a common stopping point for travel between Dakar and Banjul.  Its borders correspond roughly to the Saalum Kingdom of precolonial days, and the area is still spoken of as the Saalum in Wolof, and its inhabitants are called Saalum-Saalum.

Kaolack city is the administrative centre for the region. It is a port on the Saloum River. Lying in a farm area, Kaolack is a major peanut marketing and exporting center and has a large peanut oil factory. Brewing, leather tanning, cotton ginning, and fish processing are also important industries. Salt is produced from salines near the Saloum River. The city is on the railroad from Dakar to the Niger River in Mali. Kaolack is the international centre of the Ibrahimiyyah branch of the Tijaniyyah Sufi order, whose mosque is on the city's outskirts.

Departments
The Kaolack Region is subdivided into three departments:
Guinguinéo Département
Kaolack Département
Nioro du Rip Département

References

 
Regions of Senegal